The Snoke Farmstead, in Cass County, Nebraska near Eagle, Nebraska, was listed on the National Register of Historic Places in 1998.

Some part of the farmstead dates from 1875.

It has also been known as Snoke-Tate Farmstead.

References

External links

Farms on the National Register of Historic Places in Nebraska
National Register of Historic Places in Cass County, Nebraska
Buildings and structures completed in 1875